Vanessa Ann Fuchs (born 22 March 1996 in Bergisch Gladbach) is a German model, currently based in New York City.

At the age of 19, the 1.80 metre tall Vanessa Fuchs became the winner of the tenth cycle of Germany's Next Topmodel.  The final of the event with Heidi Klum was broadcast on ProSieben on 28 May 2015. As the winner, Fuchs received a model contract with Günther Klum's model agency ONEeins, an Opel Adam Rocks and prize money of 100,000 euros.

As of July 2020, she has over 300,000 followers on Instagram.

References

External links
 

German female models
Germany's Next Topmodel winners
Living people
People from Bergisch Gladbach
1996 births